New Zealand Refrigerating Company Limited founded 1881 by a committee led by John Roberts killed New Zealand livestock at its Burnside Works built in 1883 in Green Island Dunedin, froze the carcasses and shipped them for wholesaling in Smithfield, London.

In 1905 Christchurch Meat Company of Islington bought  New Zealand Refrigerating Company Limited and on 25 August 1916 Christchurch Meat Company took its subsidiary's name as its own.

The main  New Zealand Refrigerating Company works at Islington near Christchurch was operated over the last quarter of the 20th century by the same company finally trading as Silver Fern Farms. The works closed in 2008.

The site in Islington was acquired early in the 21st century cleared and rebuilt as a business and industrial park, Waterloo Business Park, named after Waterloo Road on its eastern boundary.

New Zealand Refrigerating Company

A committee was formed in Dunedin early in 1881 but it was not until New Zealand Shipping Company's steamer S S Mataura arrived over twelve months later that New Zealand Refrigerating Company directors: John Roberts, Edwin Spence and Alexander Begg took responsibility for overseeing the loading of freshly killed stock owned by runholders for freezing on board ship. As well as the 3,844 sheep, 6 bullocks and 77 sucking pigs the Mataura carried: hares, rabbits, fowls, ducks, barracudas, hapuka, pūkeko, frost fish, cheeses, hams and a cask of penguin skins. The New Zealand Refrigerating Company made a tiny profit but the shipping company's costs of the voyage exceeded their freight charge. The shippers on their own account were pleased with results but the overfat sheep were unsaleable.

Canterbury Meat Export Company
The Canterbury Meat Export Company from its canning works in remote Templeton (now Islington), Christchurch, pigs were brought in to dispose of the waste, made New Zealand's first meat exports in 1870. Defective tins, over-supply and a period when station-owners were unwilling to take the risk of having their own livestock canned led to the company's liquidation and the acquisition of the plant by the Bank of New Zealand. The plant was recommissioned in 1879

Canterbury Frozen Meat and Dairy Produce Company
In Christchurch John Cooke (1852–1917) formed The Canterbury Frozen Meat and Dairy Produce Company in March 1882. Cooke had acquired the Templeton works of Canterbury Meat Export and plant in Belfast. CFM did not take Templeton but bought some of the land  at Belfast and a new freezing works at Belfast was in operation in February 1883.

Canterbury Frozen Meat Company (later renamed New Zealand Refrigerating Company)
The old Templeton canning works long back in use became the site of a new Freezing work in 1889 erected by the newly formed Canterbury Frozen Meat Company, secretly promoted by John Cooke. The new company with its directors and shareholders almost entirely from Belfast Northern Ireland  bought the farmers' livestock taking the risk  of getting a good price in London. This arrangement had great appeal for small farmers. The trade became established but unregulated shipments created shortages and gluts on the British market and farmers who shipped on their own account found it difficult to check on the activities of possibly unscrupulous buyers.

Canterbury Lamb
This is the company that established the reputation of Canterbury lamb in Britain.

Killing capacity
Advertised daily killing capacity in 1927:
Sheep and lambs
 7,000 Islington
 6,000 Smithfield
 6,000 Imlay
 2,000 Picton
 3,500 BurnsideCattle
 50 Islington 
 50 Smithfield
 200 Imlay
 30 Picton
 50 Burnside

Businesses bought by CMC / NZR
Year founded and year bought by Christchurch Meat Company / New Zealand Refrigerating Company
 Christchurch Meat Company Islington
1882 New Zealand Refrigerating Company, Burnside 1905
1885 South Canterbury Refrigerating Company, Smithfield 1895
1881 Towers & Company London 1915
1891 Wanganui Meat Freezing Company, Castlecliff 1926 (and closed)
1891 Nelson Brothers (London), Blenheim 1897
1897 Wairau Freezing Company, Spring Creek 1899

25 August 1916 Christchurch Meat Company changed its name to The New Zealand Refrigerating Company Limited
 New Zealand Refrigerating Company Islington
1916 New Zealand Refrigerating Company, Imlay
1924 G B Field & Company, London 1930
1958 New Zealand Meat Packers Wanganui 1964

Sold
1914 Christchurch Meat Company, Pukeuri 1922 Waitaki Farmers Freezing Company
Christchurch Meat Company Pukeuri near Oamaru 5 Mark 1914 taken over by Waitaki Farmers Freezing Company in 1922

References

Meat processing in New Zealand
Defunct meat export companies of New Zealand
Defunct food and drink companies of New Zealand
Companies based in Dunedin
New Zealand companies established in 1881
Food and drink companies established in 1881